Vittorio Ballio Morpurgo (Rome, 1890 - Rome, 1966) was an Italian architect. He was a prominent representative of Italian Rationalist architecture of the 1930s.

References

1890 births
1966 deaths
20th-century Italian architects
Architects from Rome